VIFF Dragons and Tigers Award for Young Cinema was an award from the Vancouver International Film Festival for a film director from the Asia-Pacific region. Presented to a film judged as the best film by an emerging director within the festival's Dragons and Tigers program for Asian cinema, it awarded a creative and innovative film, made early in the director's career, which had not yet won significant international recognition.

First created in 1994, the award was discontinued after 2013. It was replaced with a general Best New Director Award, open to all emerging international filmmakers with films screening in any festival program.

Nominated films were selected by film scholar and critic Tony Rayns.

Award winners

References

External links 
 Awards at the Vancouver International Film Festival

Vancouver International Film Festival awards
Asian cinema
Asian-Canadian cinema
Awards established in 1994
1994 establishments in British Columbia
2013 disestablishments in British Columbia
Awards disestablished in 2013